The 1959 NAIA World Series was the third annual tournament hosted by the National Association of Intercollegiate Athletics to determine the national champion of baseball among its member colleges and universities in the United States and Canada.

The tournament was played at Kokernot Field in Alpine, Texas, near the campus of Sul Ross State College.

Southern defeated Omaha in the championship series, 10–2, to win the Jaguars' first NAIA World Series. With the change in tournament format, Southern was the first team to win the  NAIA World Series despite losing a tournament game.

Western Washington player Roger Repoz was named tournament MVP.

The tournament field decreased in size from the 1958 event, shrinking from twelve back to eight teams. Furthermore, the format of the tournament changed from single-elimination to double-elimination.

Bracket

See also
 1959 NCAA University Division baseball tournament

Reference

NAIA World Series
NAIA World Series
NAIA World Series